Austromusotima camptozonale, the climbing maidhair pyralid moth, is a moth of the family Crambidae. It is native to Australia, but attempts have been made to introduce it to southern Florida as a biological control agent for Old World climbing fern.

The wingspan is about 10 mm.

The larvae feed on Lygodium microphyllum, Lygodium japonicum and Lygodium palmatum.

References

External links
Efforts to establish a foliage-feeding moth, Austromusotima camptozonale, against Lygodium microphyllum in Florida, considered in the light of a retrospective review of establishment success of weed biocontrol agents
Australian Insects

Musotiminae
Moths of Australia
Moths described in 1897
Taxa named by George Hampson